Llano Grande is a district of the Cartago canton, in the Cartago province of Costa Rica.

History 
Llano Grande was created on 10 January 1938 by Decreto Ejecutivo 11.

Geography 
Llano Grande has an area of  km² and an elevation of  metres.

Demographics 

For the 2011 census, Llano Grande had a population of  inhabitants.

Transportation

Road transportation 
The district is covered by the following road routes:
 National Route 218
 National Route 401

References 

Districts of Cartago Province
Populated places in Cartago Province